Silent Interviews: On Language, Race, Sex, Science Fiction, and Some Comics is a 1995 non-fiction collection of interviews with author, professor, and critic Samuel R. Delany.

The book was a finalist for the 1995 Hugo Award for Best Non-Fiction Book.

References

1995 non-fiction books
Books by Samuel Delany
Essay collections
Wesleyan University Press books
Books of interviews
American non-fiction books